Volleyball is one of the most popular sports in Poland. The men's national team is ranked first and the women's team is ranked 12th in the FIVB World Rankings. Both teams have had much success in international competitions.

 PlusLiga
 TAURON 1. Liga (men's volleyball)
 TAURON Liga
 I Liga (women's volleyball)
 Polish Men's Volleyball Cup
 Polish Men's Volleyball SuperCup
 Polish Women's Volleyball Cup
 Poland men's national volleyball team
 Poland women's national volleyball team

See also
 Sports in Poland

External links
 Polish Volleyball Federation official site 
 PlusLiga official site
 TAURON 1. Liga official site  
 TAURON Liga official site